Daniel George Gough (18 March 1900 – 15 April 1952) was an Australian rules footballer who played for Fitzroy and Carlton in the Victorian Football League (VFL).

George Gough was one of these schoolboys who would one day be a competent footballer, he started as a youngster playing with the Croxton I.O.R. junior team, till 1918, when he came of age and transferred to Preston in the V.J.F.A. competition. Fitzroy recruited him the following year.
Gough, a small forward, had the first of two separate stints in the VFL. He played mainly as a half-forward and rover but after three seasons he had enough of Fitzroy's coach so he crossed over to play for his local VFA side, Northcote.

He then turned out for Northcote playing at full forward. In his third season he topped the league's goal-kicking with 83 goals. His tally that year included a bag of 25 goals against Prahran which set a VFA record which has never been broken.
In 1926 he was second in the league goalkicking for the year. He was so consistent that Carlton express keen interest in him.

On the back of these performances, Gough was picked up by Carlton and started well by kicking five goals on his debut for the club. He finished the season with a tally of 30 goals and backed it up the following year with 36 goals, four of them in the Semi Final loss to Richmond. In his 24 games at Carlton, Gough went goal-less only once.

After two years with Carlton, Gough returned to Northcote in 1929 and played up the field on the wing. He lost his passion for the game and retired mid-season.

He was cleared to Preston for the 1930 season.

He died after a long illness, at his home in Regent and was survived by his wife and two sons.

References

Holmesby, Russell and Main, Jim (2007). The Encyclopedia of AFL Footballers. 7th ed. Melbourne: Bas Publishing.

1900 births
1952 deaths
Australian rules footballers from Victoria (Australia)
Australian Rules footballers: place kick exponents
Fitzroy Football Club players
Carlton Football Club players
Northcote Football Club players
Preston Football Club (VFA) players